John Moschitta Jr. (born August 6, 1954), also known as "Motormouth" John Moschitta and The Fast-Talking Guy, is an American actor, singer and spokesman. He is best known for his rapid speech delivery. He appeared in over 100 commercials as "The Micro Machines Man" and in a 1981 ad for FedEx. He provided the voice for Blurr in The Transformers: The Movie (1986), The Transformers (1986–1987), Transformers: Animated (2008–2009) and two direct-to-video films.

Moschitta had been credited in The Guinness Book of World Records as the World's Fastest Talker, with the ability to articulate 586 words per minute. His record was broken in 1990 by Steve Woodmore, who spoke 637 words per minute and then by Sean Shannon, who spoke 655 words per minute on August 30, 1995. However, Moschitta questions the legitimacy of those who claim to be faster than he is.

FedEx commercial
In 1981, Moschitta appeared on the ABC TV series That's Incredible! where he recited the lyrics from "Ya Got Trouble" from The Music Man. The appearance led to many other television offers, such as The Tonight Show and the Merv Griffin Show. Also, after seeing the show, Patrick Kelly and Michael Tesch, employees of the Ally & Gargano ad agency, hired Moschitta to appear in a FedEx commercial; the package-delivery company was then still known by its original name, Federal Express. In the ad, "Fast Paced World", directed by Joe Sedelmaier, Moschitta played a fast-talking executive named Jim Spleen. The commercial garnered six Clio Awards, including Best Performance–Male award for Moschitta and earned him the nickname "Motormouth". Turn-of-the-century polls named it the Most Effective Campaign in the History of Advertising and named Moschitta the Most Effective Spokesperson. The 40th-anniversary issue of New York Magazine (October 6, 2008) listed it as number one in "The Most Memorable Advertisements Madison Avenue Ever Sold." Advertising Age ranked the ad number 11 among its "Top 100 Campaigns" in March 1999. According to Moschitta, he did 29 flawless takes of the final scene of the commercial, prompting the director to remark that he is "like a machine" who never makes mistakes. In response, Moschitta deliberately fumbled on a line, which was ultimately the take that was used in the final cut.

Other television work
He was a contestant on Pyramid in the 1970s and then was a production assistant on Pyramid producer Bob Stewart's game show Shoot for the Stars in 1977 and later played two weeks of Pyramid as a celebrity, one in 1983 and one in 1988.

In addition to his commercials for Federal Express, Moschitta completed over 750 television and radio commercials, including national campaigns for Minute Rice, Quality Inn, Northwest Airlines, Olympus Camera, Mattel, Post Cereals, Tiger Games, Continental Airlines, Burger King, ABC, NBC, CBS, PBS, HBO, Micro Machines, and JetBlue. The "Great Cable Comparison" spot for HBO, in which he played a dozen characters, earned him his second Clio recognition and a Silver Medal from the International Film and Television Festival of New York (1985). In 1996, Moschitta was honored by the Academy of Television Arts & Sciences (the Emmy organization) for his contribution to outstanding commercials.

Moschitta also appeared in a number of movies and television shows. For example, he voiced the character of Blurr in The Transformers: The Movie, and reprised the character in Transformers Animated.

Moschitta has been an announcer on two television game shows: Hollywood Squares and Balderdash.

In 2016, Moschitta appeared on an episode of Superhuman on FOX as a part of the challenge "Fast Car" in which he rapidly explained the various prices of three different vehicles to mental calculator Mike Byster, who had to calculate the sticker prices of each one correctly. The episode aired on June 26, 2017.

Audio recordings
In 1986, Moschitta recorded a spoken-word album entitled Ten Classics in Ten Minutes. In this recording, Moschitta summarizes ten classic literary tales in one minute each. The collection includes stories such as Herman Melville's Moby-Dick; William Shakespeare's Romeo and Juliet; F Scott Fitzgerald's The Great Gatsby; Margaret Mitchell's Gone with the Wind; and John Steinbeck's The Grapes of Wrath. Soon after, the team produced a second recording, Professor John Moschitta's Ten-Minute University. In it, Moschitta delivered 60-second lectures on various subjects such as comparative literature, physics, economics, psychology, and football. Both were originally released on audio cassette in the 1980s; they were released on CD in 2004, with accompanying books.

Selected filmography

Film
 Young Doctors in Love (1982) — Complaining man
 Starchaser: The Legend of Orin (1985) — Z'Gork (voice)
 The Transformers: The Movie (1986) — Blurr (voice)
 Going Under (1990) — Defense Contractor (as John Moschitta) 
 Dick Tracy (1990) — Radio Announcer 
 Blankman (1994) — Mr. Crudd
 John Bronco (2020) — Himself

Television
 Nickel Flicks (1979) — Host
 Madame's Place (1982) — Larry Lunch
 Matt Houston (1983) — Myron Chase
 The Transformers (1986–1987) — Punch / Blurr / Blowpipe (voice) (as John Moschitta)
 Sesame Street (1989) — Porter Pepper of Peter Piper "P" Products, a new baby with names from the alphabet
 Saved by the Bell (1989) — George Testaverde
 Mathnet (1991) — Johnny Dollar
 Garfield and Friends (1992) — Super Sonic Seymour
 Pinky and the Brain (1997) — Kurt Sackett, senior supervisor of the Hackensack Socko Kicky-Sack Sack Kicker Factory
 Hollywood Squares (2003–2004) — Announcer
 Balderdash (2004–2005) — Announcer
 Robot Chicken (2007–2012) — Elrond, Azmuth, auctioneer, NASA crew member, hostage, Micro Machines Man, Trap-Jaw (credited as John Moschitta in one episode only)
 Transformers: Animated (2008–2009) — Blurr (voice)
 Family Guy episode: "Fox-y Lady" (2009) - FedEx Guy (voice)
 Adventure Time (2010) — Key-per (voice)
 Oddities (2013) — Himself

See also
 Fran Capo, fastest female speaker
 Tachylalia, term for extremely rapid speech

References

Further reading

External links

1954 births
Living people
20th-century American male actors
21st-century American male actors
American male film actors
American male television actors
American male voice actors
American people of Italian descent
Contestants on American game shows
Game show announcers
Male actors from New York City